Calliostoma waikanae, common name the Waikanae top shell, is a species of medium-sized sea snail, a marine gastropod mollusc in the family Calliostomatidae, the calliostoma top snails.

Subspecies
 Calliostoma waikanae forsteriana Dell, 1950

Description
The size of the shell varies between 35 mm and 55 mm.

Distribution
This marine species occurs off New Zealand, the Kermadec Islands; Northern Queensland to New South Wales, Australia

References

 Oliver, W.R.B. (1926). New Zealand species of Calliostoma. Proceedings of the Malacological Society of London. 17 : 107–115, pl. 10
 Marshall, 1995. A revision of the recent Calliostoma species of New Zealand (Mollusca:Gastropoda:Trochoidea). The Nautilus 108(4):83-127

External links

Further reading 
 Powell A. W. B., New Zealand Mollusca, William Collins Publishers Ltd, Auckland, New Zealand 1979 
 Marshall, 1995. A revision of the recent Calliostoma species of New Zealand (Mollusca:Gastropoda:Trochoidea). The Nautilus 108(4):83-127

waikanae
Gastropods of New Zealand
Gastropods described in 1926